Confessions of a Monk (German: Die Memoiren eines Mönchs) is a 1922 Austrian silent drama film written and directed by Friedrich Feher and starring Magda Sonja, Max Neufeld and Friedrich Feher.

The film's sets were designed by the art directors Alfred Kunz and Franz Meschkan.

Cast
Magda Sonja as Elga 
Max Neufeld as Graf Starschensky 
Friedrich Feher as Oginski 
Viktor Franz as Diener 
Tini Senders
Victor Kutschera
Max Devrient
Auguste Stärk-Liedermann

See also
The Monastery of Sendomir (1919)
The Monastery of Sendomir (1920)

References

External links

Austrian silent feature films
Films directed by Friedrich Feher
Austrian black-and-white films
Films set in the 17th century
Films set in Poland
Films based on short fiction
Films based on works by Franz Grillparzer